The Jaguar Mark 2 is a mid-sized luxury sports saloon built from late 1959 to 1967 by Jaguar in Coventry, England. The previous Jaguar 2.4 Litre and 3.4 Litre models made between 1955 and 1959 are identified as Mark 1 Jaguars.

The Mark 2 was a fast and capable saloon in line with Sir William Lyons' 1950s advertising slogan: Grace . . . Space . . . Pace, available with all three versions of the advanced Jaguar XK6 I6 engine, the 2.4, 3.4, and 3.8 litre.

Production of the 3.8 ended in the (northern) autumn of 1967, with discounted sale of the 3.4 continuing on as the 340 until September 1968, and the 2.4 as the 240 until April 1969.

There was no direct successor to the Mark 2 series.  The 3.8 litre Jaguar S-type, an upscaled and refined version of the Mark 2, had already appeared in 1963, well before the first of the Mark 2 models was discontinued. The Jaguar 420, a more powerful and refined version of the S-Type, appeared in 1966.  Both of those models remained in production until late 1968, when the Jaguar XJ6 appeared, ostensibly replacing and placed rather midway between them and the larger, more expensive Jaguar Mark X produced since 1961.

Engine
The 3.8 is similar to the unit used in the 3.8 E-Type (called XKE in the USA), having the same block, crank, connecting rods and pistons but different inlet manifold and carburation (two SUs versus three on the E-Type in Europe) and therefore  less. The head of the six-cylinder engine in the Mark 2 had curved ports compared to the straight ports of the E-Type configuration. The 3.4 Litre and 3.8 Litre cars were fitted with twin SU HD6 carburettors and the 2.4 Litre with twin Solex carburettors.

Aware of the importance of the quotable numbers to the US market Jaguar continued to use claimed gross bhp figures throughout the production period of the Mk II and 240/340 models. A direct conversion into DIN bhp is not possible, but the 3.8 Mk II engine developed about 190 bhp by modern DIN standards. This compares with the later 4.2 XJ6 engine which also gave around 190 bhp DIN, or 245 gross bhp according to Jaguar. The explanation was that the XJ6 4.2 engine was delivering the power at less rpm. The camshaft timing and inlet and exhaust valve sizes were the same for the 2.4,3.4,3.8 Mk II and XJ6 4.2 engines, so the engines throttled themselves sooner in the bigger engine sizes. Later 4.2 XJ6 engines had special induction pipes, to reduce exhaust emissions, that crossed over between the inlet and exhaust sides of the engine. These reduced bhp to around 170 bhp on later production.

Body
The new car was re-engineered above the waistline, with vision dramatically improved by an 18% increase in cabin glass area. Slender front pillars allowed a wider windscreen, and the rear window almost wrapped around to the enlarged side windows, now with the familiar Jaguar D-shape above the back door and fully chromed frames for all the side windows. The radiator grille was changed, and larger side, tail and fog lamps were repositioned. Inside a new heating system was fitted and ducted to the rear compartment. There was an improved instrument layout that became standard for all Jaguar cars until the XJ series II of 1973.

Mechanical changes
The front suspension geometry was rearranged to raise the roll centre and the rear track widened. Four-wheel disc brakes were now standard. Power steering, overdrive or automatic transmissions could be fitted at extra cost. The 3.8 litre was supplied fitted with a limited-slip differential.

The Mark 2 was over 100 kg heavier than the 2.4 / 3.4 cars.

The car continued to use a live axle at the rear.

240 and 340

Some time on or about September 1967 the 3.8 litre model was discontinued and the 2.4 and 3.4 litre Mark 2 cars were rebadged as the 240 and 340 respectively  as gap-fillers until the XJ6 arrived in September 1968. The 340 was discontinued at that time, but remaining Series 2 parts were used up producing budget-priced 240s until April 1969.  These sold at £1364, only £20 more than the first 2.4 in 1956.

It now had a straight-port type cylinder head and twin HS6 SU carburettors with a new inlet manifold. The automatic transmission was upgraded to a Borg-Warner 35 dual drive range. Power steering by Marles Varamatic was now available on the 340. Both Models continued to fit the Dunlop 6.40H15 Crossply tyres as standard. 185VR15 Pirelli Cinturato was the radial alternative. There was a slight reshaping of the rear body and slimmer bumpers and over-riders were fitted. For the first time the 2.4 litre model could exceed 100 mph, resulting in a slight sales resurgence.

The 240 and 340 models retained cost-saving downgrades that had appeared a year earlier in the Mark 2 series. Standard leather upholstery was replaced by Ambla, a leather-like synthetic material, and tufted carpet was used on the floor. The front fog lamps were replaced with circular vents and made optional for the UK market. The sales price was reduced to compete with the Rover 2000 TC.

Production
Mark 2: 83,976 produced between 1959 and 1967, split as follows:
2.4 litre  – 25,173
3.4 litre  – 28,666
3.8 litre  – 30,141

240 and 340: 7,246 produced between 1967 and 1969, split as follows:
240    – 4,446
340    – 2,788
380    –    12 (not a standard production option)

The XJ6 was introduced in September 1968.

Performance
The test car cost £1951 including taxes of £614.

Motorsport
 Bob Jane won the 1962 Australian Touring Car Championship driving a 3.8 litre Mark 2.
 Michael Parkes and Jimmy Blumer won the 1962 The Motor Six Hours International Saloon Car Race driving a 3.8 litre Mark 2. 
 Peter Nöcker won the 1963 European Touring Car Challenge driving a 3.8 litre Mark 2.
 Bob Jane won the 1963 Australian Touring Car Championship driving a 3.8 litre Mark 2 (fitted with a 4.1 litre engine).
 Roy Salvadori and Denny Hulme won the 1963 Brands Hatch 6 Hours driving a 3.8 litre Mark 2.

Daimler 2.5 V8 and V8-250
 

Jaguar also marketed from 1962 to 1969 a distinctive Daimler version of the Mark 2 branded Daimler 2.5 V8 fitted with Daimler's   2½-litre V8. In late 1967 it was re-labelled V8-250 when the Mark 2 became the Jaguar 240. This significant reduction in mass over the front wheels and redistribution of weight to the rear reduced understeer during hard cornering.

These cars were externally identified by Daimler fluting at the top of the radiator grille and the top of the rear number plate lamp cover, their smoothness, and the sound of their V8 engine. They were given distinctive interior fittings.

Legacy

The Mark 2's body lines, derived from the Mark 1, and overall layout proved sufficiently popular over time to provide inspiration for the second-generation Jaguar S-Type, a nostalgia model introduced in 1999. Brendan McAleer of the Globe and Mail described the 2015 Jaguar XE as the Mark 2's spiritual descendant.

Japanese automaker Mitsuoka Motors produced the Viewt in 1994, a subcompact hatchback with Jaguar MK2 features.

Portrayal in media

Popular as getaway cars, they were also employed by the police to patrol British motorways.

A Regency red 1960 Mark 2 was used by Detective Chief Inspector Morse throughout the Inspector Morse television series. The car was given away in 2002 in a competition after the ending of the series and, after resales, in November 2005 was sold for more than £100,000.

Notes

References
Schrader, Halwart: Typenkompass Jaguar – Personenwagen seit 1931, Motorbuch-Verlag, Stuttgart (2001), 
Stertkamp, Heiner: Jaguar – die komplette Chronik von 1922 bis heute, 2. Auflage, Heel-Verlag, (2006)

External links

 Video of 3.8 and 3.4 as new (as well as Daimler 2.5 V8)
 Volunteer register with records and photos of the Mk. II

Mark 2
Jaguar Mark 2
Cars introduced in 1959
Cars discontinued in 1969
Rear-wheel-drive vehicles
Touring cars
Limousines
Sports sedans
Executive cars